Nanak Dukhiya Sub Sansar (1970) is a Punjabi language film directed by Dara Singh. The lyrics were written by Prem Dhawan. Dhawan was awarded National Film Award for Best Lyrics in 1972 for its movie songs.

The film stars Dara Singh, Balraj Sahni and Pran in the lead roles. In this film Vindu Dara Singh debuted as a child actor.

Plot 
During a riot in 1948, two brothers get separated. Years later they meet and become each other's friend. Gradually they learn about the actual relationship, that they are brothers. This knowledge does not help to stop their fight over a woman.

The film also shows the negative effect of alcoholism. In a song in the movie, a lead character states that the God resides with them who works hard in the fields and elsewhere, hence does not have necessity of any addiction.

Cast 
 Prithviraj Kapoor as Village Gurdwara Sahib head Granthi 
 Balraj Sahni as subedar Varyam Singh
 Dara Singh as Kartar Singh
 Shaminder as Ram
 Meena Rai as Jetta 
 Pran as villager Giani
 Achala Sachdev as Kartar mother 
 Rammohan Sharma as Peter
 Daljeet as Sant Ram, Kartar's father
 Satyajeet as young Kartar Singh
 Vindu Dara Singh as young Ram
 Ratan Aulakh as Liquor store owner son 
 Moolchand as Bhola Ram
 Mumtaz Begum as Varyam's sister
 Manju as Sheila
 Saudagar Singh

Soundtrack

Box office 
The film was successful at the box office.

See also 
 Nanak Shah Fakir, film released in 2018

References

External links 
 

1970 films
Punjabi-language Indian films
1970s Punjabi-language films
Films directed by Dara Singh